Mahatma Gandhi Road, M. G. Road for short, is a road situated in Kodialbail in the city of Mangalore, India. Like most of its counterparts in other Indian cities, this road is in the heart of the city and is one of the busiest roads in Mangalore, consisting of shopping malls, educational institutions, media houses, government offices, etc. M. G. Road starts at P. V. S. Circle and joins the Kulur Ferry Road near Lady Hill.

M. G. Road was named after the father of the nation Mahatma Gandhi.

Educational Institutions 
 S. D. M. Law College
 Canara College
 Shree Devi Education Trust

Shopping Malls/ Commercial Buildings 
 Empire Mall
 T. M. A. Pai International Convention Centre
 Saibeen Complex
 Hotel Deepa Comforts

Government Offices 
 Mangalore City Corporation.

Other Notable places 
 Pabbas ice cream

Gallery 

Localities in Mangalore
Roads in Mangalore